Baddeleys Beach and Campbells Beach are a contiguous settlement on adjacent beaches on the southern side of Tāwharanui Peninsula in the Auckland Region of New Zealand. The beaches are on Millon Bay, which is a part of Kawau Bay.

The land around Millon Bay was originally covered by kauri and other native trees, which were the focus for logging by early European settlers. Once the land was cleared it was used for dairy farming by the Baddeley and Campbell families. In the mid-1960s, with farming proving financially marginal, blocks were sold off for the building of baches. These subsequently were upgraded to or replaced by permanent dwellings.

Baddeleys Beach Reserve and Campbells Beach Reserve give public access to the beaches at each end of the settlement and provide basic amenities.

Demographics
The settlement is part of the larger Tawharanui Peninsula statistical area.

Baddeleys Beach-Campbells Beach had a population of 84 at the 2018 New Zealand census, an increase of 21 people (33.3%) since the 2013 census, and a decrease of 3 people (−3.4%) since the 2006 census. There were 36 households, comprising 42 males and 42 females, giving a sex ratio of 1.0 males per female. The median age was 61.7 years (compared with 37.4 years nationally), with 9 people (10.7%) aged under 15 years, 3 (3.6%) aged 15 to 29, 36 (42.9%) aged 30 to 64, and 36 (42.9%) aged 65 or older.

Ethnicities were 92.9% European/Pākehā, 10.7% Māori, and 3.6% Asian. People may identify with more than one ethnicity.

Although some people chose not to answer the census's question about religious affiliation, 57.1% had no religion, 32.1% were Christian and 3.6% had other religions.

Of those at least 15 years old, 18 (24.0%) people had a bachelor's or higher degree, and 15 (20.0%) people had no formal qualifications. The median income was $25,100, compared with $31,800 nationally. 9 people (12.0%) earned over $70,000 compared to 17.2% nationally. The employment status of those at least 15 was that 21 (28.0%) people were employed full-time, 9 (12.0%) were part-time, and 6 (8.0%) were unemployed.

Notes

Matakana Coast
Rodney Local Board Area
Populated places in the Auckland Region